Development aid is a type of foreign/international/overseas aid given by governments and other agencies to support the economic, environmental, social, and political development of developing countries. Closely-related concepts include: developmental aid, development assistance, official development assistance, development policy, development cooperation and technical assistance. It is distinguished from humanitarian aid by aiming at a sustained improvement in the conditions in a developing country, rather than short-term relief. Development aid is thus widely seen as a major way to meet Sustainable Development Goal 1 (end poverty in all its forms everywhere) for the developing nations.

Aid may be bilateral: given from one country directly to another; or it may be multilateral: given by the donor country to an international organisation such as the World Bank or the United Nations Agencies (UNDP, UNICEF, UNAIDS, etc.) which then distributes it among the developing countries. The proportion is currently about 70% bilateral 30% multilateral.

About 80% of the aid measured by the OECD comes from government sources as official development assistance (ODA). The remaining 20% or so comes from individuals, businesses, charitable foundations or NGOs (e.g., Oxfam). Most development aid comes from the Western industrialised countries but some poorer countries also contribute aid.

Development aid is not usually understood as including remittances received from migrants working or living in diaspora—even though these form a significant amount of international transfer—as the recipients of remittances are usually individuals and families rather than formal projects and programmes. Some governments also include military assistance in the notion of "foreign aid", although the international community does not usually regard military aid as development aid.

Related terms 

There are various terms that are interchangeable with "development aid" in some contexts but possess significantly different meanings in others.

 Aid is a more general concept which can include humanitarian aid (emergency relief) and other voluntary transfers not specifically aimed at development. Other expressions that relate to aid in general include "foreign aid", "international aid", and "overseas aid".

 Developmental aid is an expression sometimes used to indicate aid that is more genuinely or effectively oriented to development than what is commonly regarded as development aid.

 Development assistance is a synonym of "development aid" often used in international forums such as the UN and the OECD. official development assistance (ODA) is aid given by OECD-member governments that specifically targets the economic development and welfare of countries with the lowest per capita incomes. It includes humanitarian aid as well as development aid in the strict sense.

 Development cooperation despite apparently suggesting a potentially wide range of co-ordinated action, has often been used synonymously with "development aid". In the early 21st century, "development cooperation" has become a key term in a discourse associated with the Global Partnership for Effective Development Cooperation. In this context it encompasses activities that may not be directly related to aid, such as domestic and global policy changes, co-ordination with profit-making and civil society entities, and exchanges between less-developed countries.

Types of development aid by source, channel and recipient

Non-ODA development aid 
Analyses of development aid often focus on ODA, as ODA is measured systematically and appears to cover most of what people regard as development aid. However, there are some significant categories of development aid that fall outside ODA, notably: private aid, remittances, aid to less-poor countries and aid from other donor states.

Private development aid 
A distinction is often made between development aid that is governmental ("official") on the one hand, and private (originating from individuals, businesses and the investments of charitable foundations, and often channeled through religious organisations and other NGOs) on the other. Official aid may be government-to-government, or it may be channeled through intermediary bodies such as UN agencies, international financial institutions, NGOs or other contractors. NGOs thus commonly handle both official and private aid. Of aid reported to the OECD, about 80% is official and 20% private.

Remittances 
Remittances—money sent home by foreign workers—might be considered a form of development aid, although it is not usually regarded as such. World Bank estimates for remittance flows to "developing countries" in 2016 totalled $422 billion, which was far greater than total ODA. The exact nature and effects of remittance money remain contested. The International Monetary Fund has reported that private remittances may have a negative impact on economic growth, as they are often used for private consumption of individuals and families, not for economic development of the region or country.

Aid to less-poor countries 
ODA only includes aid to countries which are on the DAC List of ODA Recipients which includes most countries classified by the World Bank as of low and middle income.

Weakly-concessional loans 
Loans from one state to another may be counted as ODA only if their terms are substantially more favourable than market terms. The exact rules for this have varied from time to time. Less-concessional loans therefore would not be counted as ODA but might be considered as including an element of development aid.

Aid from other donor states 
Some states provide development aid without reporting to the OECD using standard definitions, categories and systems. Notable examples are China and India. For 2018, the OECD estimated that, while total ODA was about $150 billion,  an additional six to seven billion dollars of ODA-like development aid was given by ten other states. (These amounts include aid that is humanitarian in character as well as purely developmental aid.)

TOSSD 
Recognizing that ODA does not capture all the expenditures that promote development, the OECD in 2014 started establishing a wider statistical framework called TOSSD (Total Official Support for Sustainable Development) that would count spending on "international public goods". In March 2022, TOSSD was adopted as a data source for indicator 17.3.1 of the SDGs global indicator framework to measure development support. The TOSSD data for 2020 shows more than USD 355 billion disbursed to support for sustainable development, from almost 100 provider countries and institutions. The Commitment to Development Index published annually by the Center for Global Development is another attempt to look at broader donor country policies toward the developing world. These types of activity could be formulated and understood as a kind of development aid although commonly they are not.

Bilateral v multilateral 
Official aid may be bilateral: given from one country directly to another; or it may be multilateral: given by the donor country to pooled funds administered by an international organisation such as the World Bank or a UN Agency (UNDP, UNICEF, UNAIDS, etc.) which then uses its funds for work in developing countries. To qualify as multilateral, the funding must lose its identity as originating from a particular source. The proportion of multilateral aid in ODA was 28% in 2019.

History

Britain's development funding for its colonies
The concept of development aid goes back to the colonial era at the turn of the twentieth century, in particular to the British policy of colonial development that emerged during that period. The traditional government policy had tended to favor laissez-faire style economics, with the free market for capital and goods dictating the economic role that colonies played in the British Empire.

Changes in attitudes towards the moral purpose of the Empire, and the role that government could play in the promotion of welfare slowly led to a more proactive policy of economic and developmental assistance towards poor colonies. The first challenge to Britain was the economic crisis that occurred after World War I. Prior to the passage of the 1929 Colonial Development Act, the doctrine that governed Britain (and other European colonizers) with their territories was that of financial self-sufficiency. What this simply meant was that the colonies were responsible for themselves.

Britain was not going to use the money that belongs to the metropole to pay for things in the colonies. The colonies did not only have to pay for infrastructural development but they also were responsible for the salaries of British officials that worked in the colonies. The colonies generated the revenues to pay for these through different forms of taxations. The standard taxation was the import and export taxes. Goods going out of the colonies were taxed and those coming in were also taxed. These generated significant revenues. Apart from these taxes, the colonizers introduced two other forms of taxes: hut tax and labor tax. The hut tax is akin to a property tax today. Every grown up adult male had their own hut. Each of these had to pay a tax. Labor tax was the work that the people had to do without any remunerations or with meager stipends. As the economic crisis widened and had significant impact on the colonies, revenues generated from taxes continued to decline, having a significant impact on the colonies. While this was going on, Britain experienced major unemployment rates. The parliament began to discuss ways in which they could deal with Britain's unemployment rates and at the same time respond to some of the urgent needs of the colonies. This process culminated in the passage of the Colonial Development Act in 1929, which established a Colonial Development Advisory Committee under the authority of the Secretary of State for the Colonies, then Lord Passfield. Its initial annual budget of £1 million was spent on schemes designed to develop the infrastructure of transport, electrical power and water supply in colonies and dominions abroad for the furtherance of imperial trade. The 1929 Act, though meager in the resources it made available for development, was a significant Act because it opened the door for Britain to make future investments in the colonies. It was a major shift in colonial development. The doctrine of financial self-sufficiency was abandoned and Britain could now use metropolitan funds to develop the colonies.

By the late 1930s, especially after the British West Indian labour unrest of 1934–1939, it was clear that this initial scheme was far too limited in scope. A Royal Commission under Lord Moyne was sent to investigate the living conditions in the British West Indies and it published its Report in 1940 which exposed the horrendous living conditions there.

Amidst increasing criticism of Britain's colonial policies from abroad and at home, the commission was a performance to showcase Britain's "benevolent" attitude towards its colonial subjects. The commission's recommendations urged health and education initiatives along with increased sugar subsidies to stave off a complete and total economic meltdown. The Colonial Office, eager to prevent instability while the country was at war, began funneling large sums of cash into the region.

The Colonial Development and Welfare Act was passed in 1940 to organize and allocate a sum of £5 million per year to the British West Indies for the purpose of long-term development. Some £10 million in loans was cancelled in the same Act. The Colonial Development and Welfare Act of 1945 increased the level of aid to £120m over a twenty-year period. Further Acts followed in 1948, 1959 and 1963, dramatically increasing the scope of monetary assistance, favourable interest-free loans and development assistance programs.

Postwar expansion

The beginning of modern development aid is rooted in the context of Post-World War II and the Cold War. Launched as a large-scale aid program by the United States in 1948, the European Recovery Program, or Marshall Plan, was concerned with strengthening the ties to the West European states to contain the influence of the USSR. Implemented by the Economic Cooperation Administration (ECA), the Marshall Plan also expanded its reconstruction finance to strategic parts of the Middle East and Asia.

Although Marshall aid was initially offered to Europe in general, the Soviet Union forbade its neighbouring states from accepting it. This has been described as "the moment of truth" in the post-World War II division of Europe. The Soviet Union provided aid to countries in the communist bloc; for instance, on Poland's abstention from the Marshall Plan, Stalin promised a $450 million credit and 200,000 tons of grain.

In January 1949 the inaugural address of U.S. president Harry Truman announced an extension of aid to "underdeveloped areas" in the form of technical assistance. While the main theme of the speech was strengthening the free world against communism, in his fourth point Truman also appealed to the motives of compassion and pride in civilization. "For the first time in history, humanity possesses the knowledge and skill to relieve the suffering of these people." The United Nations followed up the US initiative later that year by setting up an Extended Programme of Technical Assistance (EPTA) to help pool international donor funds for technical assistance and distribute them through UN agencies. EPTA was a precursor of UNDP.

U.S. aid for development in the 1950s came to include grants and concessional loans as well as technical assistance. This development aid was administered alongside military aid within the framework of the Mutual Security Act. But for most of the decade there was no major multilateral body to provide concessional loans. An initiative to create such a body under the UN met with resistance from the U.S. on the grounds that it was premature. Accordingly, when the UN's "Special Fund" was created at the end of 1958, its remit was only for technical assistance not loans. (The Special Fund was differentiated from EPTA by assisting public infrastructure rather than industrial projects.)

In 1959, a significant annual amendment to the Mutual Security Act declared that it was "a primary objective of the United States" to assist "the peoples of other lands who are striving to establish and develop politically independent and economically viable units". This shifted the emphasis of U.S. economic aid away from immediate Cold War security needs, towards supporting the process of dismantling the empires of the UK, France and other European colonial powers. The amendment also made clear that Congress expected those industrialized nations which had been helped by U.S. aid to rebuild after the war would now share more of the burden of helping less-developed countries.

Following on, the U.S. encouraged the Organisation for European Economic Cooperation (OEEC) to set up a Development Assistance Group (DAG) composed of the main donor states, in order to help coordinate their aid. This was done in January 1960. The following year the DAG adopted a "Resolution of the common aid effort", vowing to increase the volume of aid, and to share the task equitably. Shortly after this, the OEEC was succeeded by the OECD, expanding its scope from Europe to the world, and embracing a particular concern with less-developed countries. The DAG became the Development Assistance Committee (DAC).

1960 also saw the creation of a multilateral institution to provide soft loans for development finance. The International Development Association (IDA) was created as part of the World Bank (over which the U.S. and other Western countries exerted more influence than they did over the UN).

In 1961 several Western states established government departments or agencies to administer aid, including USAID in the United States.

In 1960 the USA was providing half of all aid counted by the OECD. This proportion increased to 56% by 1965, but from 1965 to 1973 (the year of the oil price crisis), the volume of U.S. aid generally declined in real terms (though it increased in nominal terms, due to inflation). The other OECD-DAC members meanwhile generally increased their aid, so that the total volume of OECD aid was fairly constant up to 1973.

After the Cold War 
The quantity of ODA dropped sharply in the seven or eight years after the fall of the Berlin wall (1999-2007).

The turn of the 21st century saw a significant proliferation and diversification in aid donors and non-governmental actors. The traditional donors in the DAC have been joined by emerging economies (China, India, Saudi Arabia, Turkey, Brazil, Venezuela, etc.), some of which are still receiving aid from Western countries. Many of these new donors do not feel compelled to conform to traditional donors' norms. Generally demanding conditionality in return for assistance, which means tying aid to the procurement of goods and services, they are challenging traditional development aid standards.

Multinational corporations, philanthropists, international NGOs and civil society have matured into major players as well. Even though the rise of new development partners had the positive effect of bringing an increased variety of financing, know-how and skills to the development community, at the same time it has shaken up the existing aid system.

Extent of development aid 

Most development aid is counted as part of the official development assistance (ODA) reported by governments to the OECD. The total amount of ODA in 2018 was about $150 billion. For the same year, the OECD estimated that six to seven billion dollars of aid was given by ten other states, including China and India. However, these amounts include aid that is humanitarian in character as well as purely developmental aid. The proportion of development aid within ODA was about 80%.

Top recipient countries

Top donor countries 

The OECD also lists countries by the amount of ODA they give as a percentage of their gross national income. The top 10 DAC countries in 2020 were as follows. Six countries met the longstanding UN target for an ODA/GNI ratio of 0.7% in 2020:

  – 1.14%
  – 1.11%
  – 1.02%
  and  – 0.73%
  – 0.7%
  – 0.59%
  – 0.53%
  – 0.48%
  and  – 0.47%
 ,  and – 0.31%

European Union countries that are members of the Development Assistance Committee gave 0.42% of GNI (excluding the US$19.4 billion given by EU Institutions).

By type of project

Debated effectiveness and impacts 

There are many debates about the effectiveness and possible unfavourable impacts of development aid.

Dissident economists such as Peter Bauer and Milton Friedman argued in the 1960s that aid is ineffective:

In economics, there are two competing positions on aid. A view pro aid, supported by Jeffrey Sachs and the United Nations, which argues that foreign aid will give the big push to break the low-income poverty trap poorer countries are trapped in. From this perspective, aid serves to finance  "the core inputs to development – teachers, health centers, roads, wells, medicine, to name a few". (United Nations 2004). And a view that is skeptic about the impacts of aid, supported by William Easterly, that points out that aid has not proven to work after 40 years of large investments in Africa.

Reducing recipient government accountability and national democracy

Foreign aid may hinder the development of democracy in recipient states, by reducing governments' need to raise taxes from citizens, thus making those governments more autonomous and less sensitive to citizen demands, while citizens, on their part, have less necessity to make demands on the government. Although international aid has done far-reaching things with respect to increasing access to improved medical care, improving education, and decreasing poverty and hunger, only in 1997 did the World Bank began to rethink its aid policy structure and begin using parts of it specifically for building up the state capability of the aid-receiving nations. In 2004, the USA set up the Millennium Challenge Corporation, to provide development aid in a way that fostered recipient country ownership, and only to countries with good systems of governance.

Corruption 

Foreign aid encourages rent-seeking, which is when government officials and leaders use their position and authority to increase their personal wealth without creating additional wealth, at the expense of the citizens. Most African leaders and officials are able to amass huge sums of personal wealth for themselves from the foreign aid received—they enrich themselves and do not use the aid provided for its intended purpose.

It has been argued that much government-to-government aid was ineffective because it was merely a way to support strategically important leaders (Alesino and Dollar, 2000). A good example of this is the former dictator of Zaire, Mobuto Sese Seko, who lost support from the West after the Cold War had ended. Mobuto, at the time of his death, had a sufficient personal fortune (particularly in Swiss banks) to pay off the entire external debt of Zaire.

Promoting neopatrimonialism and poor governance 
American political scientist and professor Nicolas van de Walle has also argued that despite more than two decades of donor-supported reform in Africa, the continent continues to be plagued by economic crises due to the combination of state generated factors and to the counter productivity of international development aid to Africa. Van de Walle first attributes the failure to implement economic policy reform to factors within the African state:

 Neopatrimonial tendencies of state elites that serve to preserve and centralize power, maintain limited access orders, and create political obstacles to reform.
 Ideological obstacles that have been biased by two decades of failed economic policy reform and in turn, create a hostile environment for reform.
 Low state capacity that reinforces and that in turn, is reinforced by the neopatrimonial tendencies of the state.

Van de Walle later argues that these state generated factors that have obstructed the effective implementation of economic policy reform are further exacerbated by foreign aid. Aid, therefore, makes policy reform less likely, rather than more likely. Van de Walle posits that international aid has sustained economic stagnation in Africa by:

 Pacifying Africa's neopatrimonial tendencies, thereby lessening the incentives for state elites to undertake reform and preserving the status quo.
 Sustaining poorly managed bureaucratic structures and policies that would be otherwise rectified by market forces.
 Allowing state capacities to deteriorate through externalizing many state functions and responsibilities.

In order for aid to be productive and for economic policy reform to be successfully implemented in Africa, the relationship between donors and governments must change. Van de Walle argues that aid must be made more conditional and selective to incentivize states to take on reform and to generate the much needed accountability and capacity in African governments.

Additionally, information asymmetries often hinder the appropriate allocation of aid; Blum et al. (2016) note that both South Sudan and Liberia struggle tremendously with paying employees and controlling the flow of money - South Sudan had a significant number of ghosts on its payroll, while Liberia's Civil Service Agency could not adequately pay civil servants because there was minimal communication from the Ministries of Health and Education regarding their respective payrolls.

Besides some instances that only the president (and/or his close entourage) receives the money resulting from development aid, the money obtained is often badly spent as well. For example, in Chad, the Chad Export Project, an oil production project supported by the World Bank, was set up. The earnings of this project (6.5 million dollars per year and rising) were used to obtain arms. The government defended this purchase by stating that "development was not possible without safety". However, the Military of Chad is notorious for severe misconduct against the population (abuse, rape, claiming of supplies and cars) and did not even defend the population in distress (e.g. in the Darfur conflict). In 2008, the World Bank retreated from the project that thus increased environmental pollution and human suffering.

The Center for Global Development have published a review essay of the existing literature studying the relationship between Aid and public institutions. In this review,  they concluded that a large and sustained Aid can have a negative effect in the development of good public institutions in low income countries. They also mention some of the arguments exhibited in this article as possible mechanism for this negative effect, for instance, they considered the Dutch Disease, the discourage of revenue collections and the effect on the state capacity among others.

Effects of development aid in Africa 
Dambisa Moyo argues that aid does not lead to development, but rather creates problems including corruption, dependency, limitations on exports and Dutch disease, which negatively affect the economic growth and development of most African countries and other poor countries across the globe. Moyo devotes a section of her book, Dead Aid to rethinking the aid dependency model. She cautions that although "weaning governments off aid won't be easy", it is necessary. Primary among her prescriptions is a "capital solution" where African countries must enter the bond market to raise their capital for development, the interconnectedness that globalization has provided, will turn other "pools of money toward African markets in form of mutual funds, hedge funds, pension schemes" etc.

Other research has shown that development aid has a strong and favorable effect on economic growth and development through promoting investments in infrastructure and human capital. According to a study conducted among 36 sub-saharan African countries in 2013, 27 out of these 36 countries have experienced strong and favorable effects of aid on GDP and investments. Another study showed that aid per capita supports economic growth for low income African countries such as Tanzania, Mozambique and Ethiopia, while aid per capita does not have a significant effect on the economic growth of middle income African countries such as Botswana and Morocco. Aid is most beneficial to low income countries because such countries use aid received for to provide education and healthcare for citizens, which eventually improves economic growth in the long run.

Effects depend on geography 
Jeffery Sachs and his collaborators argue that in order for foreign aid to be successful, policy makers should "pay more attention to the developmental barriers associated with geography specifically, poor health, low agricultural productivity, and high transportation costs".  The World Bank and the International Monetary Fund are two organizations that Sachs argues are currently instrumental in advising and directing foreign aid; however, he argues that these two organizations focus too much on "institutional reforms". Foreign aid is especially multifaceted in countries within Sub-Saharan Africa due to geographic barriers. Most macro foreign aid efforts fail to recognize these issues and, as Sachs argues, cause insufficient international aid and policy improvement. Sachs argues that unless foreign aid provides mechanisms that overcome geographic barriers, pandemics such as HIV and AIDS that cause traumatic casualties within regions such as Sub-Saharan Africa will continue to cause millions of fatalities.

Death of local industries 
Foreign aid kills local industries in developing countries. Foreign aid in the form of food aid that is given to poor countries or underdeveloped countries is responsible for the death of local farm industries in poor countries. Local farmers end up going out of business because they cannot compete with the abundance of cheap imported aid food, that is brought into poor countries as a response to humanitarian crisis and natural disasters. Large inflows of money that come into developing countries, from the developed world, in a foreign aid, increases the price of locally produced goods and products. Due to their high prices, export of local goods reduces. As a result, local industries and producers are forced to go out of business.

Neocolonialism 
Neocolonialism is where a state is "in theory, independent and has all the outward trappings of international sovereignty. In reality its economic system and thus its political policy is directed from outside". The political and economic affairs of a state under neocolonialism, is directly controlled by external powers and nations from the Global North, who offer aid or assistance to countries in the Global South or developing countries. Neocolonialism is the new face of colonialism, which is made possible by foreign aid. Donor countries offer foreign aid to poor countries while bargaining for economic influence  of the poor or receiving countries, and policy standards that allow donor countries to control economic systems of poor countries, for the benefit of the donor countries.  

Foreign aid creates a system of dependency where developing or poor countries become heavily dependent on western or developed countries for economic growth and development. As less developed countries become dependent on developed countries, the poor countries are easily exploited by the developed countries such that the developed world are able to directly control the economic activities of poor countries.

Aid dependency 
Aid dependence is defined as the "situation in which a country cannot perform many of the core functions of government, such as operations and maintenance, or the delivery of basic public services, without foreign aid funding and expertise". Aid has made many African countries and other poor regions incapable of achieving economic growth and development without foreign assistance. Most African economies have become dependent on aid and this is because foreign aid has become a significant norm of systems of international relations between high and low income countries across the globe.

Foreign aid makes African countries dependent on aid because it is regarded by policy makers as regular income, thus they do not have any incentive to make policies and decisions that will enable their countries to independently finance their economic growth and development. Additionally, aid does not incentivize the government to tax citizens, due to the constant inflow of foreign aid, and as a result, the citizens do not have any obligation to demand the provision of goods and services geared towards development.

Econometric studies 
Many econometric studies in recent years have supported the view that development aid has no clear average effect on the speed with which countries develop. Negative side effects of aid can include an unbalanced appreciation of the recipient's currency (known as Dutch Disease), increasing corruption, and adverse political effects such as postponements of necessary economic and democratic reforms.

Other econometric studies suggest that development aid effectively reduces poverty in developing countries.

Promoting or easing conflict 
Furthermore, the effect of Aid on conflict intensity and onset have been proved to have different impacts in different countries and situations. For instance, for the case of Colombia Dube and Naidu (2015) showed that Aid from the US seems to have been diverted to paramilitary groups, increasing political violence. Moreover, Nunn and Qian (2014) have found that an increase in U.S. food aid increases conflict intensity; they claim that the main mechanism driving this result is predation of the aid by the rebel groups. In fact, they note that aid can have the unintentional consequence of actually improving rebel groups' ability to continue conflict, as vehicles and communications equipment usually accompany the aid that is stolen. These tools improve the ability of rebel groups to organize and give them assets to trade for arms, possibly increasing the length of the fighting. Finally, Crost, Felter and Johnston (2014) have showed that a development program in the Philippines have had the unintended effect of increasing conflict because of a strategic retaliation from the rebel group, on where they tried to prevent that the development program increases support to the government.

Imposition of inappropriate strategies and technologies 
According to James Ferguson, these issues might be caused by deficient diagnostics of the development agencies. In his book The Anti-Politics Machine, Ferguson uses the example of the Thaba-Tseka project in Lesotho to illustrate how a bad diagnostic on the economic activity of the population and the desire to stay away from local politics, caused a livestock project to fail.

According to Martijn Nitzsche, another problem is the way on how development projects are sometimes constructed and how they are maintained by the local population. Often, projects are made with technology that is hard to understand and too difficult to repair, resulting in unavoidable failure over time. Also, in some cases the local population is not very interested in seeing the project to succeed and may revert to disassembling it to retain valuable source materials. Finally, villagers do not always maintain a project as they believe the original development workers or others in the surroundings will repair it when it fails (which is not always so).

A common criticism in recent years is that rich countries have put so many conditions on aid that it has reduced aid effectiveness. In the example of tied aid, donor countries often require the recipient to purchase goods and services from the donor, even if these are cheaper elsewhere. Other conditions include opening up the country to foreign investment, even if it might not be ready to do so.

Other criticisms of development aid 
Besides questions of effects and effectiveness, other criticisms have been made of development aid.

Inappropriate behaviour by aid workers 
Development aid is often provided by means of supporting local development aid projects. In these projects, it sometimes occurs that no strict code of conduct is in force. In some projects, the development aid workers do not respect the local code of conduct. For example, the local dress code as well as social interaction. In developing countries, these matters are regarded highly important and not respecting it may cause severe offense, and thus significant problems and delay of the projects.

Tied aid 
There is also much debate about evaluating the quality of development aid, rather than simply the quantity.  For instance, tied aid is often criticized, as the aid given must be spent in the donor country or in a group of selected countries. According to a 1991 report for the OECD, tied aid can increase development aid project costs by up to 20 or 30 percent.

Contradictions between aid and other donor policies 
There is also criticism because donors may give with one hand, through large amounts of development aid, yet take away with the other, through strict trade or migration policies, or by getting a foothold for foreign corporations. The Commitment to Development Index measures the overall policies of donors and evaluates the quality of their development aid, instead of just comparing the quantity of official development assistance given.

At the development level, anthropologist and researcher Jason Hickel has challenged the narrative that the rich countries of the OECD help the poor countries develop their economies and eradicate poverty. Hickel states that the rich countries "aren't developing poor countries; poor countries are developing rich ones."

Imposition of Western values and agendas 
Another criticism has been that Western countries often project their own needs and solutions onto other societies and cultures. In response, western help in some cases has become more 'endogenous', which means that needs as well as solutions are being devised in accordance with local cultures. For example, sometimes projects are set up which wish to make several ethnic groups cooperate. While this is a noble goal, most of these projects fail because of this intent. Additionally, although the goal in utility to provide a larger social benefit may be justified as worthy, a more ethically sourced incentive would be projects not looking for an opportunity to impose a social hierarchy through cooperation, but more-so for the sake of truly assisting recipients. The intent of cooperation is not necessarily a reason for failure, but the very nature of different aspirations towards defining virtues which exist in direct context with respective societies. In this way a disconnect may be perceived among those imposing their virtues onto ethnic groups interpreting them.

Political bias in aid allocation 
The practice of extending aid to politically aligned parties in recipient nations continues today; Faye and Niehaus (2012) are able to establish a causal relationship between politics and aid in recipient nations. In their analysis of the competitive 2006 Palestinian elections, they note that USAID provided funding for development programs in Palestine to support the Palestinian Authority, the US backed entity running for reelection. Faye and Niehaus discovered that the greater the degree of alignment the recipient party has with the donor entity, the more aid it receives on average during an election year. In an analysis of the 3 biggest donor nations (Japan, France, and the US), Alesina and Dollar (2000) discovered that each has its own distortions to the aid it gives out. Japan appears to prioritize giving aid nations that exercise similar voting preferences in the United Nations, France mostly sends aid to its former colonies, and the U.S. disproportionately provides aid to Israel and Egypt. These allocations are often powerful tools for maintaining the strategic interests of the donor country in the recipient country.

Proposed good practices 
The following proposals have been made about good practice in development aid.

For aid to work well, donors need to invest heavily in staff who maintain sustained relationships with counterparts in recipient countries, in order to deal intelligently and flexibly with the complex difficulties involved:

Public accountability of aid is important, both for the sake of democratic citizenship in recipient countries, and for realistic and sustainable attitudes to aid in donor countries.:

Types of development aid by activity and aim 
The OECD classifies ODA development aid by sector, the main sectors being: education, health (including population policies, water supply and sanitation), government & civil society, economic infrastructure (including transport and energy), and production (including agriculture). Additionally, there are "cross-cutting" aims; for instance, environmental protection, gender equality, urban and rural development concerns.

Some governments include military assistance in the notion of "foreign aid", although the international community does not usually regard military aid as development aid.

Aid for gender equality 
Starting at the beginning of the UN Decade for Women in 1975, the women in development (WID) approach to international development began to inform the provision of development aid. Some academics criticized the WID approach for relying on integrating women into existing development aid paradigms instead of promulgating specific aid to encourage gender equality. The gender and development approach was created in response, to discuss international development in terms of societal gender roles and to challenge these gender roles within development policy. Women in Development predominated as the approach to gender in development aid through the 1980s. Starting in the early 1990s Gender and Development's influence encouraged gender mainstreaming within international development aid.

The World Conference on Women, 1995 promulgated gender mainstreaming on all policy levels for the United Nations. Gender Mainstreaming has been adopted by nearly all units of the UN with the UN Economic and Social Council adopting a definition which indicated an "ultimate goal ... to achieve gender equality". The UN included  promoting gender equality and empowering women as one of eight Millennium Development Goals for developing countries.

The EU integrated women in development thinking into its aid policy starting with the Lomé Convention in 1984. In 1992 the EU's Latin American and Asian development policy first clearly said that development programs should not have detrimental effects on the position and role of women. Since then the EU has continued the policy of including gender equality within development aid and programs. Within the EU gender equality is increasingly introduced in programmatic ways. The bulk of the EU's aid for gender equality seeks to increase women's access to education, employment and reproductive health services. However, some areas of gender inequality are targeted according to region, such as land reform and counteracting the effects of gangs on women in Latin America.

USAID first established a women in development office in 1974 and in 1996 promulgated its Gender Plan of Action to further integrate gender equality into aid programs. In 2012 USAID released a Gender Equality and Female Empowerment Policy to guide its aid programs in making gender equality a central goal. USAID saw increased solicitations from aid programs which integrated gender equality from 1995 to 2010. As part of their increased aid provision, USAID developed PROMOTE to target gender inequality in Afghanistan with $216 million in aid coming directly from USAID and $200 million coming from other donors.

Many NGOs have also incorporated gender equality into their programs. Within the Netherlands, NGOs including Oxfam Netherlands Organization for Development Assistance, the Humanist Institute for Cooperation with Developing Countries, Interchurch Organization for Development Cooperation, and Catholic Organization for Relief and Development Aid have included certain targets for their aid programs with regards to gender equality. NGOs which receive aid dollars through the Norwegian Ministry of Foreign Affairs or which partner with the Norwegian government on aid projects must "demonstrate that they take women and gender equality seriously". In response to this requirement organizations like the Norwegian Christian charity Digni have initiated projects which target gender equality.

Private foundations provide the majority of their gender related aid to health programs and have relatively neglected other areas of gender inequality. Foundations, such as the Bill and Melinda Gates Foundation, have partnered with governmental aid organizations to provide funds for gender equality, but increasingly aid is provided through partnerships with local organizations and NGOS. Corporations also participate in providing gender equality aid through their Corporate Social Responsibility programs. Nike helped to create the Girl Effect to provide aid programs targeted towards adolescent girls. Using publicly available data Una Osili an economist at the Indiana University-Purdue University Indianapolis found that between 2000 and 2010 $1.15 billion in private aid grants over $1 million from the United States targeted gender equality.

The Organisation for Economic Co-operation and Development provides detailed analysis of the extent of aid for gender equality. OECD member countries tag their aid programs with gender markers when a program is designed to advanced gender equality. In 2019-20 OECD DAC members committed almost $56.5 billion to aid for gender equality, with $6.3 billion of that committed to programs where gender equality is a principal programmatic goal.

Effectiveness of aid for gender equality 
Three main measures of gender inequality are used in calculating gender equality and testing programs for the purposes of development aid. In the 1995 Human Development Report the United Nations Development Program introduced the Gender Development Index and Gender Empowerment Measure. The Gender Empowerment Measure is calculated based on three measures, proportion of women in national parliaments, percentage of women in economic decision making positions and female share of income. The Gender Development Index uses the Human Development Index and corrects its results in life expectancy, income, and education for gender imbalances. Due to criticisms of these two indexes the United Nations Development Program in its 2010 Human Development Report introduced the Gender Inequality Index. The Gender Inequality Index uses more metrics and attempts to show the losses from gender inequality.

Even with these indexes, Ranjula Swain of the Stockholm School of Economics and Supriya Garikipati of the University of Liverpool found that, compared to the effectiveness of health, economic, and education targeted aid, foreign aid for gender equality remains understudied. Swain and Garikipati found in an analysis of Gender Equality Aid that on a country and region-wide level gender equality aid was not significant in its effect. Swain and Garikipati blame this on the relative lack of aid with gender equality as a primary motivation.

In 2005, the Interagency Gender Working Group of the World Health Organization released the "So What? Report" on the effectiveness of gender mainstreaming in NGO reproductive health programs. The report found these programs effective, but had trouble finding clear gender outcomes because most programs did not measure this data. When gender outcomes were measured, the report found positive programmatic effects, but the report did not look at whether these results were from increased access to services or increasing gender equality.

Even when gender equality is identified as a goal of aid, other factors will often be the primary focus of the aid. In some instances the nature of aid's gender equality component can fail to be implemented at the level of individual projects when it is a secondary aspect of a project. Gender equality is often put forward as a policy goal for the organization but program staff have differing commitment and training with regards to this goal. When gender equality is a secondary aspect, development aid which has funds required to impact gender equality can be used to meet quotas of women receiving aid, without effecting the changes in gender roles that Gender Mainstreaming was meant to promote. Programs can also fail to provide lasting effects, with local organizations removing gender equality aspects of programs after international aid dollars are no longer funding them.

Robert C. Jones of McGill University and Liam Swiss of Memorial University argue that women leaders of governmental aid organizations and NGOs are more effective at Gender Mainstreaming than their male counterparts. They found in a literature review that NGOs headed by women were more likely to have Gender Mainstreaming programs and that women were often the heads of Gender Mainstreaming programs within organizations. By breaking down gender equality programs into two categories, gender mainstreamed programs and gender-focused programs which do not mainstream gender, Jones and Swiss found that female leaders of governmental aid organizations provided more financial support to gender mainstreamed programs and slightly more support to gender aware programs overall.

Criticism of aid for gender equality 
Petra Debusscher of Ghent University has criticized EU aid agencies for following an "integrationist approach" to gender mainstreaming, where gender mainstreaming is used to achieve existing policy goals, as opposed to a "transformative approach" which seeks to change policy priorities and programs fundamentally to achieve gender equality. She finds that this approach more closely follows a Women in Development model than a Gender and Development one. Debussher criticized the EU's development policy in Latin America for focusing too much attention on gender inequality as a problem to be solved for women. She found that the language used represented more of a Woman in Development approach than a Gender and Development Approach. She notes that men's role in domestic violence is insufficiently brought forward, with program and policy instead targeting removing women from victimhood. Rather than discussing the role of men and women relative to each other, women are discussed as needing to "catch up with an implicit male norm". Debussher also criticized EU's development aid to Southern Africa as too narrow in its scope and too reliant on integrating women and gender into existing aid paradigms. Debusscher notes that women's organizations in the region are often concerned with different social constructions of gender, as opposed to the economic growth structure favored by the EU. For EU development aid to Europe and surrounding countries, Debsusscher argued that programs to encourage education of women were designed primarily to encourage overall economic growth, not to target familial and social inequalities.

Some criticism of gender equality development aid discusses a lack of voices of women's organizations in developing aid programs. Debusscher argued that feminist and women's organizations were not represented enough in EU aid. and that while feminist and women's organizations were represented in implementing policy programs they were not sufficiently involved in their development in EU aid to Southern Africa. Similarly, Jones and Swiss argue that more women need to be in leadership positions of aid organizations and that these organizations need to be "demasculinized" in order to better gender mainstream. T.K.S. Ravindran and A. Kelkar-Khambete criticized the Millennium Development Goals for insufficiently integrating gender into all development goals, instead creating its own development goal, as limiting the level of aid provided to promote gender equality.

National development aid programs 

 Australian Agency for International Development
 Aid for Trade
 China foreign aid
 Department for International Development (United Kingdom)
 International economic cooperation policy of Japan
 Saudi foreign assistance
 Swedish International Development Cooperation Agency
 United States foreign aid
 United Arab Emirates foreign aid
Deutsche Gesellschaft für internationale Zusammenarbeit

See also

 International development
 Development economics
 Global South Development Magazine

Effectiveness and anti-corruption measures:
 Conditionality
 Aid effectiveness
 Tied aid
 International Health Partnership

General:
 Development economics

Tools and stories:
  Development Cooperation Handbook

References

Further reading
 Georgeou, Nichole, Neoliberalism, Development, and Aid Volunteering, New York: Routledge, 2012. .
 Gilbert Rist, The History of Development: From Western Origins to Global Faith, Zed Books, New Exp. Edition, 2002, 
 Perspectives on European Development Co-operation by O. Stokke
 European development cooperation and the poor by A. Cox, J. Healy and T. Voipio 
 Rethinking Poverty: Comparative perspectives from below. by W. Pansters, G. Dijkstra, E. Snel 
 European aid for poverty reduction in Tanzania by T. Voipio London, Overseas Development Institute, 
 The Bottom Billion: Why the Poorest Countries are Failing and What Can Be Done About It by Paul Collier
 How Do We Help? The Free Market in Development Aid by Patrick Develtere, 2012, Leuven University Press,

External links
 Open Aid Register
 IATI search engine (Beta). Find any development aid activity around the world. Using the IATI registry as access point.
 
 AidData: Tracking Development Finance
 Open Aid Data  Provides detailed developing aid finance data from around the world.
 Center for International Development at Harvard University
 The Centre for Aid and Public Expenditure, Overseas Development Institute 
 Millions Saved  A compilation of case studies of successful foreign assistance by the Center for Global Development.
 German Development Institute - the German think tank of development aid
 Work on Development Aid by the Institute of Development Studies (IDS)
Articles
 Abhijit Baerjee "Making Aid Work". Boston Review, March/April 2007.
 Failed Expectations, Or What Is Behind the Marshall Plan for Post-Socialist Reconstruction, by Tanya Narozhna
 Håkan Malmqvist (February 2000), "Development Aid, Humanitarian Assistance and Emergency Relief", Ministry for Foreign Affairs, Monograph No 46, Sweden
 Andrew Rogerson with Adrian Hewitt and David Waldenberg (2004), "The International Aid System 2005–2010 Forces For and Against Change ", Overseas Development Institute Working Paper 235
 "Arab Aid" from Saudi Aramco World (1979)
Videos
   ⇒   The Vrinda Project Channel  - videos on the work in progress for the achievement of the MDGs connected to the Wikibook   ⇒ Development Cooperation Handbook
 Development Cooperation Stories
 Development Cooperation Testimonials

Aid
International development
International relations
Sustainable development